Rayevka is a rural locality (a village) in Churayevsky Selsoviet, Mishkinsky District, Bashkortostan, Russia. The population was 167 as of 2010. There are 3 streets.

Geography 
Rayevka is located 50 km northwest of Mishkino (the district's administrative centre) by road. Mayevka is the nearest rural locality.

References 

Rural localities in Mishkinsky District